Brett Perlini (born 14 June 1990) is a Canadian-born British ice hockey player for Herning Blue Fox of the Danish Metal Ligaen. His brother Brendan Perlini plays for the Edmonton Oilers of the National Hockey League (NHL).

He represented Great Britain at the 2019 IIHF World Championship, 2021 IIHF World Championship and 2022 IIHF World Championship.

References

External links

1990 births
Living people
Bakersfield Condors players
English ice hockey forwards
English people of Italian descent
Fort Wayne Komets players
Greenville Road Warriors players
Herning Blue Fox players
Ice hockey people from Ontario
Indy Fuel players
Lake Erie Monsters players
Michigan State Spartans men's ice hockey players
Nottingham Panthers players
HC Pustertal Wölfe players
Rapid City Rush players
Sportspeople from Sault Ste. Marie, Ontario
Toledo Walleye players
Wichita Thunder players
Anaheim Ducks draft picks
Canadian ice hockey forwards
Canadian expatriates in England
Sportspeople from Guildford
Canadian expatriate ice hockey players in the United States
Canadian expatriate ice hockey players in Italy
Canadian expatriate ice hockey players in Norway
Canadian expatriate ice hockey players in Denmark
British expatriate ice hockey people
English expatriate sportspeople in Italy
English expatriate sportspeople in Norway
English expatriate sportspeople in Denmark
English expatriate sportspeople in the United States